Marcus Kann  (1820 in Vienna – February 3, 1886) was an Austrian chess player. He and Horatio Caro jointly analysed and published their analysis of the chess opening later to-be-called Caro-Kann Defence (1.e4 c6) in the German Brüderschaft magazine in 1886.  

During the 4th German Chess Congress in Hamburg in May 1885, Kann defeated German-British champion Jacques Mieses with the Caro-Kann Defence (ECO B12) in 24 moves. This game by Kann was added to the final tournament book, but his games from the main tournament, where he earned four points from seven games, failing to qualify to win his group, remain unpublished.

The magazine Deutsche Schachzeitung (1886, p. 128) published a short obituary after his death.

References

External links
 
 "The Caro-Kann Defence" by Edward Winter

1820 births
1886 deaths
Game players from Vienna
Austrian chess players
Chess theoreticians
19th-century chess players